Killure is a village near Goresbridge, County Kilkenny, Ireland.

References

Towns and villages in County Kilkenny